Westerlund may refer to:
 Westerlund 1, a star cluster
 Westerlund 2, a star cluster
 2902 Westerlund, a Main-belt Asteroid

People with the surname
 Anna Westerlund (born 1989), Finnish footballer
 Bengt Westerlund  (1921–2008), Swedish professor of astronomy
 Björn Westerlund (1912–2009), a Finnish businessman
 Carl Agardh Westerlund (1831–1908), Swedish malacologist
 Carl Julius Alvin Westerlund (1885–1952), Norwegian politician for the Labour Party
 Edvard Westerlund (born 1901), Finnish wrestler
 Ernst Westerlund (1893–1961), Finnish sailor
 Erkka Westerlund (born 1957), previous head coach of the Finnish national men's ice hockey team
 Helena Larsdotter Westerlund (1799-1865), Swedish educator 
 Kalle Westerlund (1897–1972), Finnish wrestler
 Karl Valdemar Westerlund (1907–1997), Norwegian politician for the Labour Party
 Majléne Westerlund Panke (born 1946), Swedish politician

Surnames of Swedish origin
Surnames of Finnish origin